Cnemaspis rubraoculus is a species of diurnal, rock-dwelling, insectivorous gecko endemic to India.

References

 Cnemaspis rubraoculus

rubraoculus
Reptiles of India
Reptiles described in 2021